Swissvale is a borough in Allegheny County, Pennsylvania, United States,  east of downtown Pittsburgh. Named for a farmstead owned by James Swisshelm, during the industrial age it was the site of the Union Switch and Signal Company of George Westinghouse. The population was 8,624 at the 2020 census. In 1940, 15,919 people lived there.

Geography
Swissvale is located at  (40.422304, -79.886185).

Surrounding and adjacent communities
Swissvale has six land borders, including Edgewood to the north, Braddock Hills to the east, North Braddock to the southeast, Rankin to the south, and the Pittsburgh neighborhoods of Regent Square and Swisshelm Park to the west. (The area known as Regent Square also encompasses portions of Pittsburgh, Wilkinsburg, Edgewood, and Swissvale.) Directly across the Monongahela River to the southwest is the borough of Munhall.

Demographics

As of the census of 2020, there were 8,624 people, 4,456 households, and 2,390 families residing in the borough. The population density was 8,052.0 people per square mile (3,105.9/km2). There were 5,097 housing units at an average density of 4,251.6 per square mile (1,640.0/km2). The racial makeup of the borough was 74.45% White, 22.14% African American, 0.11% Native American, 0.91% Asian, 0.06% Pacific Islander, 0.60% from other races, and 1.72% from two or more races. Hispanic or Latino of any race were 1.06% of the population.

There were 4,456 households, out of which 21.2% had children under the age of 18 living with them, 31.0% were married couples living together, 16.5% had a female householder with no husband present, and 48.9% were non-families. 42.0% of all households were made up of individuals, and 14.3% had someone living alone who was 65 years of age or older. The average household size was 2.06 and the average family size was 2.85.

In the borough the population was spread out, with 20.0% under the age of 18, 8.2% from 18 to 24, 31.7% from 25 to 44, 22.7% from 45 to 64, and 17.4% who were 65 years of age or older. The median age was 39 years. For every 100 females, there were 84.4 males. For every 100 females age 18 and over, there were 79.0 males.

The median income for a household in the borough was $31,523, and the median income for a family was $35,929. Males had a median income of $29,333 versus $25,184 for females. The per capita income for the borough was $19,216. About 14.1% of families and 15.3% of the population were below the poverty line, including 26.2% of those under age 18 and 10.4% of those age 65 or over.

Education
Swissvale is served by the Woodland Hills School District.

Transportation
Swissvale is served by the Roslyn and Swissvale stations on the Martin Luther King Jr. East Busway.

Notable people
Shirley Burkovich, woman's professional baseball player in AAGPBL, birthplace (1933-2022)
Billy Gardell, actor
David Conrad, actor
Frank Conrad, creator of KDKA Radio; lived In Swissvale borough 1910-15 conducting transmission experiments
William B. Dickson, steel industry executive and labor policy reformer
Michael F. Doyle, congressman 
Dick Groat, baseball player for Pittsburgh Pirates and All-American college basketball player
Agnes Christine Johnston, screenwriter
Summer Lee, politician
Esther Silveus, radiologist
Vladimir K. Zworykin, television inventor
Bobby Epps, NFL player for the New York Giants

Government and politics

History
Swissvale is named after the Swisshelm family. John Swisshelm (1752–1838), who owned a farm where the town is located.  John Swisshelm served under General George Washington in the Revolutionary War, and camped at Valley Forge.  Swisshelm married Mary Elizabeth Miller, and they had many children.  Their son, James Swisshelm, married Jane Grey Cannon, noted abolitionist and political activist, Jane Swisshelm named the town Swissvale as the town overlooked the Monongahela River Valley.  The Pittsburgh neighborhood of Swisshelm Park, adjacent to Swissvale, is  named after John Swisshelm.

Since 1874, the Allegheny Car & Transportation Shops had provided well-paying jobs to local citizens and were later purchased by George Westinghouse, the President of Westinghouse Air Brake Company, who formed the Union Switch & Signal company and maintained that facility in Swissvale.

References

Populated places established in 1898
Pittsburgh metropolitan area
Boroughs in Allegheny County, Pennsylvania
Pennsylvania populated places on the Monongahela River
1898 establishments in Pennsylvania